The 1898–99 British Home Championship was an international football tournament between the British Home Nations. A very high scoring affair, the competition featured the highest scoreline ever achieved in the Home Championships when England defeated Ireland 13–2 in Sunderland, including a hat-trick in four minutes from Gilbert Smith. It was the first of two particularly heavy defeats for the Irish side, who nevertheless still managed to finish third, courtesy of a victory over Wales.

England's win over Ireland was the start of the tournament and placed them immediately on top of the table, a position Ireland joined them in with their 1–0 victory over Wales in the second game. Scotland began their bid for the title in the third match with a strong 6–0 win over Wales in Wrexham. Wales' poor competition was finished in their next game when England again took top position by beating them 4–0. In the penultimate game, Scotland joined England at the top of the table with a 9–1 demolition of Ireland, who had conceded 21 goals in two games but still finished third. In the deciding match, England and Scotland both played a strong game but England eventually proved stronger, winning 2–1.

Table

Results

Winning squad

References

British
Home
Home
Home
British Home Championships
Brit
Brit